Aidiopsis is a monotypic genus of flowering plants in the family Rubiaceae. The type species was Aidiopsis forbesii but this is now considered a synonym of Aidiopsis orophila. It is native to Thailand, Malaysia, Sumatra, Java and the Andaman Islands.

References

Gardenieae
Monotypic Rubiaceae genera
Flora of Thailand
Flora of Peninsular Malaysia
Flora of Sumatra
Flora of Java
Flora of the Andaman Islands